was a general in the Imperial Japanese Army, Army Minister and Governor-General of Korea from 1927 to 1929.

Biography

Military career
A native of Osumi District in Sagami Province (part of the present-day city of Hiratsuka, Kanagawa Prefecture), Yamanashi graduated from the former 8th class of the Imperial Japanese Army Academy in 1886. After serving in the IJA 5th Infantry Regiment,  he graduated with honors from the 8th class of the Army Staff College in 1892. He was assigned to the IJA 4th Infantry Brigade and served in combat as an infantry platoon commander during the First Sino-Japanese War with the IJA 2nd Army.

After the war, Yamanashi's rise through the ranks was steady and rapid. He served in a number of administrative and staff positions, before being posted to Germany as a military attaché from 1898 to 1902.

During the Russo-Japanese War of 1904 to 1905, Yamanashi was vice chief-of-staff of the IJA 2nd Army and subsequently chief-of-staff of the IJA 3rd Division. He was promoted to lieutenant commander in late 1904. He returned to Europe immediately after the end of the war as military attaché to Austria-Hungary, serving from the end of 1905 to 1907, and again to Germany from 1907.

Yamanashi was promoted to major general in 1911, and assigned command of the IJA 30th Infantry Brigade. He was transferred to the IJA 1st Infantry Brigade the following year. After serving in a number of administrative positions within the Imperial Japanese Army General Staff, he was assigned as chief-of-staff of the IJA 18th Division at the Battle of Tsingtao in World War I. In 1916, Yamanashi was promoted to lieutenant general, and in 1921 he was promoted to full general.

Political career
From 1921 to 1923, Yamanashi served as Army Minister under the cabinets of Prime Ministers Hara, Takahashi and Katō Tomosaburō. As Army Minister, Yamanashi initiated reforms which cut 2200 officers and 60,000 men from the roster of the Imperial Japanese Army. This was equivalent to approximately five divisions, but as it was spread out across the entire army, the effects were less noticeable than the subsequent abolishment of four divisions outright by Yamanashi's successor, Ugaki Kazushige. Yamanashi also unsuccessfully attempted to challenge the entrenched concept within the Imperial Japanese Army that "spirit" (elan, or yamato-damashii) could prevail over deficiencies in modern weaponry or technology. However, at the end of his tenure, the Imperial Japanese Army was still behind the other major powers in terms of mechanization and aviation.

During the 1923 Great Kantō earthquake, Yamanashi was appointed martial law commander of the Tokyo region, until the post was abolished in November 1923, but continued to be head of the Tokyo regional police forces through August 1924. In 1925 he was promoted to the honorific title of Junior Third Court Rank.

Yamanashi retired from active military service in 1927. From December 1927 to August 1929, Yamanashi served as Japanese Governor-General of Korea. He followed the relatively lenient policies established by his predecessors, and there was little significant change in Korea under Japanese rule during his tenure.

However, while in Korea, he became embroiled in a prominent corruption scandal in which he was accused of having accepted a very large bribe from a rice merchant who wanted to expand into the Korean market. The accusation had political overtones, as Yamanashi was increasingly involved in Rikken Seiyūkai politics and was being touted as a possible successor to his mentor, Tanaka Giichi. Although Yamanashi was acquitted, a number of his close associates were convicted, and he retired from public life at the end of 1929. Yamanashi died of natural causes at his home in Kamakura, Kanagawa in 1944 at the age of 80.

Decorations
 1915 –   Order of the Golden Kite, 2nd class
 1920 –  Grand Cordon of the Order of the Rising Sun

References

External links 

New York Times article from 11 June 1921 on Yamanashi's promotion to War Minister

Footnotes

1864 births
1944 deaths
People from Hiratsuka, Kanagawa
Military personnel from Kanagawa Prefecture
Japanese military personnel of the First Sino-Japanese War
Japanese military personnel of the Russo-Japanese War
Japanese military personnel of World War I
Japanese military attachés
Japanese generals
Governors-General of Korea
Ministers of the Imperial Japanese Army
Grand Cordons of the Order of the Rising Sun
Recipients of the Order of the Golden Kite, 2nd class